Yoon A-jung (born November 19, 1981) is a South Korean actress.

Filmography

Television series

Film

Variety show

Awards and nominations

References

External links 
 
 
 Yoon A-jung at Star K Entertainment 
 Yoon A-jung at The Awesome Entertainment
 
 
 

1981 births
Living people
South Korean television actresses
South Korean film actresses
People from Gwangju